The Department of Health and Human Services is a department of the United States federal government.

Department of Health and Human Services may also refer to:

Australia 
Department of Health and Human Services in Tasmania
Department of Health and Human Services in Victoria
Department of Human Services and Health, the federal government department that existed between 19931996

United States 
Michigan Department of Health and Human Services
Nebraska Department of Health & Human Services
Nevada Department of Health and Human Services
New Hampshire Department of Health & Human Services
North Carolina Department of Health and Human Services

See also 
Department of Health and Human Services, et al. v. Florida, et al.
Department of Human Services and Health
DHHS (disambiguation)
List of health departments and ministries